Dónal O'Grady (born 31 December 1953) is an Irish former hurler and manager.

O'Grady had a successful playing career as a full-back at senior level with the Cork county team throughout the early 1980s. In a brief career he won one All-Ireland winner's medal, three Munster winner's medals and one National League winner's medal as captain.

At club level, O'Grady was a double All-Ireland medalist with St Finbarr's. In addition to this he has also won three Munster club winners' medals and six county championship winners' medals.

Following his retirement from playing he worked as a successful selector, coach and manager at all levels but most notably with the Cork and Limerick senior hurling teams.

O'Grady also does media work and divides his time working for RTÉ and TG4, while also writing for the Irish Examiner.

O'Grady's uncle Kevin McGrath (1921–2001) made GAA history as the first hurler, with Cork, to win three All-Ireland minor medals in a row (1937, 1938 as captain and 1939). He had previously played with North Mon (school level) and with Glen Rovers GAA (club level).

Playing career

Club
O'Grady played his club hurling with the St Finbarr's club on the south side of Cork city, a club where he experienced much success during a career which spanned two decades. He won his first county senior championship winners' medal in 1974 following 'the Barr's' 2-17 to 2-14 defeat of Blackrock. The club later represented Cork in the provincial club series and even reached the final. A 0-7 to 0-3 defeat of Clare's Newmarket-on-Fergus gave O'Grady a Munster club winners' medal. The subsequent All-Ireland club final on St Patrick's weekend saw St Finbarr's take on the Fenians of Kilkenny. St Finbarr's ability to get goals at crucial times proved to be the difference in the 3-8 to 1-6 victory. It was O'Grady's first All-Ireland club title.

In 1977 O'Grady collected a second county championship title following a victory over north side rivals and reigning champions Glen Rovers. Once again St Finbarr’s reached the Munster club final where Clare champions Sixmilebridge provided the opposition. An eventful game developed; however, St Finbarr's were easy winners by 2-8 to 0-6. It was O'Grady's second Munster club winners' medal. He lined out in the subsequent All-Ireland club final. Rathnure, the Wexford and Leinster champs, were the opponents. The first-half was a disaster for St Finbarr’s as a gale-force wind resulted in the Cork side trailing by 0-8 to 0-1. The second thirty minutes saw St Finbarr's take control with Jimmy Barry-Murphy scoring the deciding goal. A 2-7 to 0-9 victory gave O'Grady a second All-Ireland club winners' medal.

In 1980 O'Grady secured a third county title following a two-point win over Glen Rovers. A third Munster club winners' medal quickly followed after a 2-12 to 1-14 defeat of Roscrea. The subsequent All-Ireland final pitted O'Grady's St Finbarr's side against Ballyhale Shamrocks. The Cork side were beaten on that occasion.

1981 saw O'Grady appointed captain of the club's senior hurling team. That year he steered his team to a 1-12 to 1-9 victory over Glen Rovers. It was a fourth county championship winners' medal for O'Grady and a second consecutive defeat of Glen Rovers in the county championship decider.

St Finbarr's made it three-in-a-row in 1982 as Blackrock fell by 2-17 to 3-9. On a personal level it was O'Grady's fifth championship medal.

In 1984 St Finbarr's qualified for the centenary-year county final. North Cork minnows Ballyhea provided the opposition; however, they were no match for 'the Barr's'. A 1-15 to 2-4 score line gave O'Grady a sixth county title.

Inter-county
O'Grady joined the Cork senior hurling team in the 1980-81 season, having never played for his county at minor or under-21 levels. That year he captained the team to a National Hurling League title after a defeat of Offaly in the final. O'Grady was included on the Cork championship panel that year at full-back, however, 'the Rebels' made an early exit from the championship.

In 1982 Cork were back in form and O'Grady won his first Munster winners' medal following a 5-31 to 3-6 trouncing of Waterford. The subsequent All-Ireland final saw Cork take on Kilkenny. Following an impressive provincial championship campaign 'the Rebels' were the red-hot favourites, however, Kilkenny surprised.  Christy Heffernan scored two goals in a forty-second spell just before the interval to take the wind out of Cork's sails.  Ger Fennelly got a third goal within eight minutes of the restart, giving Kilkenny a 3-18 to 1-15 victory, one of their biggest over Cork.

In 1983 Cork’s run of provincial success continued. O'Grady won a second Munster title that year as Cork trounced Waterford for the second consecutive year. The subsequent All-Ireland final pitted Cork against Kilkenny for the second consecutive year also.  'The Cats' used a strong wind to dominate the opening half and built up a strong lead. Cork came storming back with goals by Tomás Mulcahy and Seánie O'Leary, however, at the full-time whistle Kilkenny had narrowly won by 2-14 to 2-12.

1984 was a special year in the annals of Gaelic games as it was the centenary year of the Gaelic Athletic Association. The year began well with O'Grady helping his team to victory in the special Centenary Cup competition. He later won his third Munster winners' medal as Cork defeated Tipperary by 4-15 to 3-14 in a memorable Munster final. The subsequent All-Ireland final, played at Semple Stadium in Thurles, saw Cork take on Offaly for the first time ever in championship history. The centenary-year final failed to live up to expectations and Cork recorded a relatively easy 3-16 to 1-12 victory. It was O'Grady's first All-Ireland winners' medal. He retired from inter-county hurling following that win.

Managerial career

Cork
In retirement from playing O'Grady has remained strongly involved at club and county level. He first gained managerial experience when he was a selector when Cork won the 1986 Munster and All-Ireland titles. He was appointed manager of the Cork senior hurling team in December 2002. It was a huge challenge for O'Grady, particularly since the inter-county hurlers had gone on strike for better conditions earlier in the year.

In his first full season in charge in 2003 O'Grady brought some new players onto the team.  John Gardiner found a regular place on the team, while Tom Kenny, Ronan Curran and Setanta Ó hAilpín all made their debuts. Success in the National League was never a priority for O'Grady, however, with a blend of youth and experience his team went on the capture their first Munster title since 2000. An exciting All-Ireland semi-final saw Cork earn a draw with Wexford, however, it was 'the Rebels' who easily won the replay. The subsequent championship decider saw Cork take on Kilkenny, with 'the Cats' earning the favourites tag. The result hung in the balance until the last five minutes when Kilkenny's Martin Comerford scored the winning goal. A 1-14 to 1-11 score line meant that Cork had fallen short.

Following their performance in 2003 Cork were regarded as one of the favourites to take the championship title in 2004. Some change to the team saw star forward Setanta Ó hAilpín depart while former star Brian Corcoran made a dramatic comeback. Cork's plan came unstuck in the Munster final when 14-man Waterford defeated O'Grady's side by a single point. This game is regarded as one of the greatest provincial finals ever played. Cork later qualified for the All-Ireland final via the qualifiers and, for the second year in-a-row, Kilkenny provided the opposition. After a poor first-half the sides were evenly matched, however, the final 23 minutes saw Cork score nine points without reply from Kilkenny. O'Grady had led Cork out of the doldrums and to an All-Ireland title.

There was some surprise when O'Grady resigned as manager immediately after the victory.

Limerick
In September 2010 O'Grady was confirmed as the new Limerick senior hurling team manager. He succeeded fellow Corkonian Justin McCarthy. Limerick played in Div 2 of the National League having gone down in 2010, they went the whole League without losing before beating Clare in the final to give O'Grady and Limerick a good start to the year with promotion to division one. On 12 June 2011, Limerick lost to Waterford in the 2011 Munster Championship semi-final by 3-14 to 3-15 at Semple Stadium.
In September 2011, O'Grady confirmed that he would not continue as Limerick hurling manager and would be stepping down from the post.

In November 2013, O'Grady was named as the new joint manager of the Limerick hurling team, alongside T. J. Ryan.
In April 2014, O'Grady stepped down from his position as joint manager of the Limerick team after comments made by him at a recent board meeting appeared in the press.

Media career
Following his hiatus from inter-county management, O'Grady developed a career in the media. He appeared on RTÉ's The Sunday Game as a regular studio analyst on the highlights programme, while also appearing on the live edition of the programme as a co-commentator. O'Grady also provided similar services for GAA Beo on TG4. He also wrote a regular hurling column in the Irish Examiner newspaper.

Managerial statistics

References

1953 births
Living people
St Finbarr's hurlers
Cork inter-county hurlers
Gaelic games commentators
Gaelic games writers and broadcasters
Heads of schools in Ireland
Hurling managers
Irish columnists
Irish Examiner people
All-Ireland Senior Hurling Championship winners
Hurling selectors
People educated at North Monastery
TG4 people